Albert Solomonov (born 25 September 1973) is a Russian-Israeli football coach and former player who is the current manager of the Lori.

Career

Managerial
On 5 August 2020, Armenian Premier League club Lori FC announced Solomonov as their new head coach on a one-year contract with the option of a second.

References

1973 births
Living people
Israeli football managers
Israeli Jews
Soviet emigrants to Israel
Soviet Jews
Mountain Jews
Hapoel Acre F.C. managers
Ahva Arraba F.C. managers
CSF Bălți managers
Moldovan Super Liga managers